This article lists the ten most populous cities in Japan by decade, starting after the Meiji Restoration of 1868. The first Japanese Census was not conducted until 1920, but other civilian and military population counts were carried out in the prior years between 1872 and 1918, and those form the source data for this article. When data is not available right on the turn of the decade, the closest year is used.

1873 
In 1868, the Meiji Restoration deposed the Tokugawa Shogunate and founded the Empire of Japan.  Many major cities had lost population since the Tokugawa Era, as samurai left the former castle towns after the collapse of the military order. 

Source data is from "Nihon Chishi Teiyo" (日本地誌提要, the Japanese Topographical Outline).

1881 
Several major cities and towns actually lost population over the 1870s, as people continued to emigrate out of the former castle towns.

Source data is from the Fourth Joint Military-Government Report (第四回共武政表), a requisitioning document listing municipal populations and available resources and provisions.

1891 
In 1888, the government enacted a sweeping overhaul of the municipal government system, part of which involved a drastic program of municipality mergers. Overall, the "Great Meiji Mergers" cut the number of municipalities in Japan by more than three quarters, while dramatically increasing the size of many cities as they absorbed their surrounding towns and villages.

Source data is from the 1891 Imperial Japanese Registered Household Report (日本帝国民籍戸口表).

1898 
Source data is from the 1898 Imperial Japanese Population Statistics (日本帝国人口統計).

1909 
Source data is from the 1908 Imperial Japanese Population Statistics (日本帝国人口統計).

1920 
Source data is from the 1920 Census (国勢調査), the first formal census to be taken in Japan.

1930 
Source data is from the 1930 Census.

1940 
Source data is from the 1940 Census.

1950 
Japan emerged from the Second World War in defeat, under temporary American administration. Many cities had been attacked by American bomber forces, and many of the largest cities suffered further loss as residents evacuated to more rural regions of the country. Cities, though, were already recovering quickly from their wartime lows.

Source data is from the 1950 Census.

1960 
A series of municipal mergers throughout the 1950s known as the "Great Showa Mergers" cut the number of municipalities in Japan by almost two thirds, significantly increasing the size of many cities in the process. By this time, almost all of Japan's largest cities had recovered war losses and exceeded their prewar populations.

Source data is from the 1960 Census.

1970 
Tokyo and Osaka began to experience a trend of suburbanization, as people left the cities for the less densely peopled surrounding municipalities. Other major cities continued to grow rapidly.

Source data is from the 1970 Census.

1980 
Source data is from the 1980 Census.

1990 
By 1990, almost all the largest Japanese cities had assumed their present-day population ranking.

Source data is from the 1990 Census.

2000 
By 2002, the ongoing suburbanization drawing population from Tōkyō and Ōsaka was showing signs of abating, with people slowly moving back into the cities proper.

Source data is from the 2000 Census.

2010 
In the mid-2000s, another series of municipal mergers was enacted. The "Great Heisei Mergers" nearly halved the number of municipalities in Japan, once again increasing the size of some cities significantly and creating new towns and cities. Despite a mounting population loss in rural areas and some smaller cities, Japan's major cities continue to grow.

Source date is from the 2010 Census.

References

External links 
 Japanese Topographical Survey- Hiroshima University Library. For 1873 populations. Japanese language.
 Historical Data Downloads- Tsukuba University Spatial Information Science. For 1881 populations. Japanese language.
 Imperial Registered Household Report, 2nd Ed.- National Archives Meiji Digital Library. For 1891 populations. Japanese language.
 Imperial Japanese Population Statistics- National Archives Meiji Digital Library. For 1898 populations. Japanese language.
 Imperial Japanese Population Statistics, 2nd Ed.- National Archives Meiji Digital Library. For 1908 populations. Japanese language.
 Government Statistics Portal- For all Census data, 1920–2010. Japanese language.

Histories of cities in Japan